Angela Alberti (born 4 February 1949) is a retired Italian gymnast. She competed at the 1972 Olympics and finished in 12th place with the Italian team. Her best individual result was 47th place on the balance beam. Alberti won four gold (team, all-around, parallel bars and vault) and two silver medals (balance beam and floor) at the 1971 Mediterranean Games.

References

1949 births
Living people
Gymnasts at the 1972 Summer Olympics
Olympic gymnasts of Italy
Italian female artistic gymnasts
Mediterranean Games medalists in gymnastics
Mediterranean Games gold medalists for Italy
Mediterranean Games silver medalists for Italy
Competitors at the 1971 Mediterranean Games
20th-century Italian women